The Queen's Division is a British Army training and administrative apparatus for infantry regiments from the east and south of England and the remaining regiment of Fusiliers.

Formation
The Queen's Division was formed in 1968 with the regimentation of the Home Counties Brigade, Fusilier Brigade and East Anglian Brigade, followed by the union of the new regiments. The depot was established at Bassingbourn Barracks in Cambridgeshire.

Cold War 
During the Cold War, the Queen's Division saw a massive expansion.  Below the list of units belonging to the division with disbandment dates or transfer dates where needed:

Following the reorganisation of the TA in 1999, the Queen's Division was reduced to just six regular battalions (two in each regiment) and just three TA battalions (one in each).

Modern day 
Because the Queen's Division already contained large regiments from the previous round of amalgamations in the 1960s, it was the only one of the five line infantry divisions to be unaffected by the restructuring announced in 2004.
Princess of Wales's Royal Regiment (Queen's and Royal Hampshire) (PWRR)
Royal Regiment of Fusiliers (RRF)
Royal Anglian Regiment (R ANGLIAN)

The Queen's Division therefore now comprises the following infantry battalions:

Regular Army Units
1st Battalion, Princess of Wales's Royal Regiment (Queen's and Royal Hampshire) 
1st Battalion Royal Regiment of Fusiliers 
1st and 2nd Battalions, Royal Anglian Regiment 
1st Battalion Duke of Lancasters Regiment 
1st Battalion Mercian Regiment 
3rd Battalion Ranger Regiment 
Royal Gibraltar Regiment
Army Reserve Units
3rd Battalion, Princess of Wales's Royal Regiment (Queen's and Royal Hampshire)
4th Battalion, Princess of Wales's Royal Regiment (Queen's and Royal Hampshire)
5th Battalion, Royal Regiment of Fusiliers
3rd Battalion, Royal Anglian Regiment

The current Colonel Commandant is Lieutenant General Douglas Chalmers.

Bands 
Before the formation of the Corps of Army Music in 1994, each battalion of the Queen's Division, except for the Royal Regiment of Fusiliers maintained a band. These included the following:

Regular Army

 Band of the 1st Battalion, Princess of Wales's Royal Regiment (formed by amalgamation of the 1 and 2 QUEENS bands)
 Band of the 2nd Battalion, Princess of Wales's Royal Regiment (formed by redesignation of R HAMPS band (Note: 3 QUEENS didn't have a band following reductions in 1984))
 Duke of Kent's Band of the Royal Regiment of Fusiliers
 Saint George's Band of the Royal Regiment of Fusiliers
 Band of the 1st Battalion, Royal Anglian Regiment
 Band of the 2nd Battalion, Royal Anglian Regiment
 Band of the 3rd Battalion, Royal Anglian Regiment

Territorial Army

 Kohima Band of the Princess of Wales's Royal Regiment – 5 PWRR (formed by redesignation of the Band of the Queen's Regiment – overseen by 5 QUEENS)
 Warwickshire Band of the Royal Regiment of Fusiliers – 5 RF
 Northumbria Band of the Royal Regiment of Fusiliers – 6 RF
Band of the Royal Anglian Regiment – 5 R ANGLIAN

Following the reductions, all above bands were reduced to the Normandy Band of the Queen's Division (Bands of the RRF) and the Minden Band of the Queen's Division (Bands of the PWRR and R ANGLIANs).

Following reductions to the Corps of Army Music, the Band of the Queen's Division was formed through amalgamation of the two former bands in 2007, but later disbanded in 2018.  CAMUS was reorganised in 2019 with the band reforming, itself now part of British Army Band Catterick.

In addition, since 1992 the Royal Gibraltar Regiment maintains a Band and Corps of Drums.

Gallery

References

Sources

External links
Queen's Division

Infantry divisions of the United Kingdom
Military units and formations established in 1968
Royal Regiment of Fusiliers
Princess of Wales's Royal Regiment
Royal Anglian Regiment